Horace Greeley Knowles (October 20, 1863 – November 2, 1937) was an American attorney and diplomat, who served as an ambassador under three U.S. presidents between 1907 and 1913.

Early life and education
Knowles was born on October 20, 1863, in Seaford, Delaware, the son of Dr. Isaac H. D. Knowles and Sarah Lavinia Short. He attended the University of Delaware and became an attorney in his home state. He married Edith E. Wallace on April 20, 1897, and they had two children.

Knowles became friends with Theodore Roosevelt, who convinced him to enter into the diplomatic corps.

Public career
Knowles served as U.S. Ambassador to Romania, Bulgaria, and Serbia in the final years of Roosevelt's presidency.  He was appointed by Roosevelt's successor, William Howard Taft, as the U.S. Ambassador to the Dominican Republic and later as the U.S. Ambassador to Bolivia a post he held through the early months of the Woodrow Wilson's administration.  For a period, Knowles remained active in Republican politics: during the 1928 presidential election he campaigned actively for Herbert Hoover, warning that if Democratic nominee Al Smith were victorious, the nation would experience high unemployment and widespread depression.

After leaving the foreign service, Knowles returned to practicing law, and appeared often before the United States Court of Claims.

Retirement and death
In the 1920s, Knowles became "a consistent critic of the policy of the United States in Central America, the Dominican Republic, and Haiti". He was also a critic of the Second Italo-Abyssinian War, and became treasurer of the "Committee for Ethiopia", conducting a fundraising drive that collected over $1 million for medical aid to the Ethiopians.

Knowles spent his final years in the Manhattan borough of New York City, New York, living at 145 East 46th Street.  He died there in his sleep on the night of November 2, 1937, of a heart ailment. He was interred at Arlington Cemetery, in Drexel Hill, Pennsylvania.

See also

 List of people from New York City
 List of University of Delaware people

References

 "Horace G. Knowles, A Former Diplomat". The New York Times. November 3, 1937. p. 23.

1863 births
1937 deaths
19th-century American lawyers
20th-century American diplomats
20th-century American lawyers
Ambassadors of the United States to Bolivia
Ambassadors of the United States to Bulgaria
Ambassadors of the United States to the Dominican Republic
Ambassadors of the United States to Romania
Ambassadors of the United States to Serbia
Philanthropists from New York (state)
Burials at Arlington Cemetery (Pennsylvania)
Charity fundraisers (people)
Delaware lawyers
Delaware Republicans
New York (state) lawyers
New York (state) Republicans
People from Manhattan
People from Seaford, Delaware
Politicians from New York City
University of Delaware alumni
United States Foreign Service personnel